Kitasatospora herbaricolor is a bacterium species from the genus of Kitasatospora which has been isolated from soil.

References

Further reading

External links
Type strain of Streptomyces herbaricolor at BacDive -  the Bacterial Diversity Metadatabase

Streptomycineae
Bacteria described in 1959